Chainpur may refer to several places:
History of chainpur
The area of Chainpur in Kaimur district of Bihar was historically ruled by Sikarwar Rajputs.[4] A document called the Kursinama purports to trace the ancestry of the Chainpur family to Fatehpur Sikri where the family was driven out during the Turkic Muslim ruler Babur's conquest , when he won battle of Khanwa.

As they fled eastwards under the leadership of Lakshmi Mal, they eventually conquered Chainpur from the Chero dynasty which was ruled by the Chero tribe.
[]

Among the most important rulers of the Chainpur Sikarwars was Raja Salivahana who built Chainpur fort and was prominent in the region prior to the ascendancy of the Afghan warlord Sher Shah Suri.[3]

Chainpur, Dhading, Dhading District, Nepal
Chainpur, Sankhuwasabha, Sankhuwasabha District, Nepal
Chainpur, Chitwan, Khairhani Municipality in Chitwan District, Nepal
Chainpur, Bajhang, Jaya Prithvi Municipality, Bajhang District, Nepal
Chainpur, Bihar, India
Chainpur block, Gumla, a community development block in Jharkhand, India
Chainpur, Gumla, a village in Jharkhand, India
Chainpur block, Palamu, Jharkhand, India